Joice is a city in Worth County, Iowa, United States. The population was 208 at the time of the 2020 census. It is part of the Mason City Micropolitan Statistical Area.

History
Joice got its start, following the construction of the Chicago and North Western Railway through that territory. A post office called Joice has been in operation since 1900. Joice was incorporated as a city in 1913. The city was named for R. M. Joice, a local banker.

Geography
Joice is located at  (43.363223, -93.455881).

Demographics

2010 census
At the 2010 census there were 222 people in 99 households, including 61 families, in the city. The racial makup of the city was 96.8% White, 0.5% Native American, and 2.7% from two or more races.

Of the 99 households 34.3% had children under the age of 18 living with them, 43.4% were married couples living together, 13.1% had a female householder with no husband present, 5.1% had a male householder with no wife present, and 38.4% were non-families. 34.3% of households were one person and 9.1% were one person aged 65 or older. The average household size was 2.24 and the average family size was 2.77.

The median age was 39.9 years. 26.1% of residents were under the age of 18; 6.8% were between the ages of 18 and 24; 25.4% were from 25 to 44; 28.4% were from 45 to 64; and 13.5% were 65 or older. The gender makeup of the city was 50.5% male and 49.5% female.

2000 census
At the 2000 census there were 231 people in 101 households, including 66 families, in the city. The racial makup of the city was 98.70% White, 1.30% from other races. Hispanic or Latino of any race were 1.30%.

Of the 101 households 33.7% had children under the age of 18 living with them, 49.5% were married couples living together, 9.9% had a female householder with no husband present, and 33.7% were non-families. 31.7% of households were one person and 12.9% were one person aged 65 or older. The average household size was 2.29 and the average family size was 2.84.

The age distribution was 26.4% under the age of 18, 10.4% from 18 to 24, 28.6% from 25 to 44, 22.9% from 45 to 64, and 11.7% 65 or older. The median age was 34 years. For every 100 females, there were 97.4 males. For every 100 females age 18 and over, there were 97.7 males.

The median household income was $39,375 and the median family income  was $48,250. Males had a median income of $32,500 versus $22,917 for females. The per capita income for the city was $17,530. About 7.9% of families and 13.0% of the population were below the poverty line, including 20.8% of those under the age of eighteen and none of those sixty five or over.

Education
The Lake Mills Community School District operates local public schools.

References

Cities in Iowa
Cities in Worth County, Iowa
Mason City, Iowa micropolitan area